François Daenen (18 August 1919 – 16 April 2001) was a Belgian footballer. He played in 17 matches for the Belgium national football team from 1945 to 1953. He was also named in Belgium's squad for the Group 2 qualification tournament for the 1954 FIFA World Cup.

References

External links
 
 

1919 births
2001 deaths
Belgian footballers
Belgium international footballers
Place of birth missing
Association football goalkeepers
R.F.C. Tilleur players